Pavel Kasinets (born 27 January 1988) is a Belarusian professional footballer who plays for Polotsk.

External links

1988 births
Living people
People from Orsha
Belarusian footballers
Association football forwards
FC Dinamo Minsk players
FC Vitebsk players
FC Polotsk players
FC Slonim-2017 players
FC Orsha players
Sportspeople from Vitebsk Region